Kyung-ah, also spelled Kyong-ah, is a Korean feminine given name. The meaning differs based on the hanja used to write each syllable of the name. There are 54 hanja with the reading "kyung" and 29 hanja with the reading "ah" on the South Korean government's official list of hanja which may be used in given names.

People with this name include:
Choi Kyung-ah (born 1969), South Korean manhwa artist
Kim Kyungah (born 1977), South Korean table tennis player
Park Kyung-ah (born 1986), South Korean artistic gymnast
Yoon Kyung-ah ( 2010s), South Korean screenwriter
Kim Kyong-a, North Korean rower, participated in Rowing at the 2010 Asian Games – Women's lightweight single sculls

See also
List of Korean given names

References

Korean feminine given names